Thrybergh Academy is a coeducational secondary school located in Thrybergh, South Yorkshire, England.

The school was founded as a secondary modern school in the 1950s, with its own buildings being opened in 1956. It later became a comprehensive school.

History
The school was awarded specialist sports college status in 2008, changing its name from Thrybergh Comprehensive School to Thrybergh School and Sports College.

The school converted to academy status in October 2013 and was renamed Thrybergh Academy and Sports College. On 1 May 2014, it formally merged with the local Dalton Foljambe Primary School to become Rotherham's only all-through school, catering for ages 3–16. The school gained new building through a PFI contract connected to the change of status, and has had difficulty servicing the repayments.

In January 2019 he school was rated 'Inadequate' by Ofsted and was placed into special measures. In May 2019 the school received a financial warning from the Education and Skills Funding Agency after the school made a significant financial loss in the previous year. At the end of 2019 the school closed its sport facilities to members of the local community, despite opposition.

In September Thrybergh Academy formally demerged its primary school provision to form the separate Foljambe Primary School. Thrybergh Academy continues to operate as a secondary school.

Ofsted inspections
Since the commencement of Ofsted inspections in September 1993, the school has undergone nine inspections:

Headteachers
 Mr Horace Edgar (Mick) Winch (born 1908 died 1977, first headteacher who arrived from Wath Secondary School)
 Mr David Pridding (April 2005 – August 2009)
 Mrs Beverley Clubley (September 2009 – August 2014)
 Mrs Siobhan Kent (September 2014 – April 2017)
 Mr Steven Rhodes (April 2017 – August 2017)
 Mr Simon Graves (September 2017– 2018)
 Mr Steven Rhodes (September 2018 – 2020)
Mr David Burnham (March 2020–)

References

Secondary schools in Rotherham
Educational institutions established in 1957
1957 establishments in England
Academies in Rotherham